The National Diaper Bank Network is a United States-based non-profit organization that is dedicated to ensuring that every child in the U.S. has an adequate supply of diapers to remain clean, dry and healthy.  NDBN is a nationwide network of independently operating diaper banks and pantries that collect and distribute over 30 million diapers for children experiencing diaper need.

History
In 2010, the founders of The Diaper Bank (North Haven, Connecticut), Westside Baby (Seattle), the Diaper Bank of Southern Arizona (Tucson, Arizona), and the St. Paul Diaper Bank Partnership (McHenry, Illinois), along with Huggies  formed the National Diaper Bank Network (NDBN) to create national dialog on the collective impact of diaper banks in addressing a most basic need of babies, access to clean diapers.

Diaper bank movement
The diaper bank movement began in 1994 when Resolve, Inc., a small consulting firm in Tucson, held a diaper drive during the holiday season to assist a local crisis nursery. Encouraged by the enthusiastic response, and the subsequent demand for emergency diaper assistance, the firm gained an understanding of how the community could come together and help solve a problem. The executives at Resolve made the December Diaper Drive an annual tradition, and within five years they were collecting 300,000 diapers during drive and distributed the diapers to families at 30 local social service agencies. In 2000, the diaper drive effort was spun off into an independent nonprofit organization, the Diaper Bank of Southern Arizona, the nation's first diaper bank.

In 2004, Joanne Samuel Goldblum, a social worker in New Haven, Connecticut, adopted the Arizona model to found The Diaper Bank in response to the desperate need for diapers that she witnessed in her work with impoverished families. Initially creating and operating the fledgling organization from her home, Joanne went on to establish the nation's largest diaper bank. Today, The Diaper Bank distributes more than 2.5 million clean diapers annually to struggling families throughout central and southern Connecticut.

The success of these two diaper banks inspired similar efforts throughout the country. With growing awareness of diaper need, small but passionate groups of people responded. Some groups held diaper drives, others went on to found independent diaper banks in their communities, often through their churches, and/or as an extension of existing poverty-related relief agencies.

Network programs
The organization raises awareness of diaper need and its pervasiveness in America through education of and outreach to the general public and national leaders. NDBN staff works with legislators, testifies at hearings on the issue of diaper need, conducts research, and advocates for changes in policy and law that support the network's mission and the partner agencies and families served.

Technical assistance and research support the development and expansion of community-based diaper banks throughout the country, so that each can better meet the basic needs of babies and families.  NDBN coordinates the distribution of donated diapers and funding to its national network of community-based diaper banks, pantries, and distribution programs.

On May 1, 2018, NDBN launched the Alliance for Period Supplies, with about 50 allied programs across the country. The program's goal is to make menstrual supplies free or affordable to all who need them.

Alabama

Birmingham – Bundles of Hope Diaper Bank
Birmingham – Junior League of Birmingham
Florence – Magnolia Church Bundle of Blessings
Huntsville – Food Bank of North Alabama
Mobile – Little Angels, Inc.
Wilmer – The Second Beginning

Alaska

Wasilla – HeartReach Center Inc

Arkansas

no active member programs

Arizona

Phoenix –  Diaper Bank of Central Arizona
Tucson – Diaper Bank of Southern Arizona

California

Fresno –  Central California Food Bank
Irvine – HomeAid Orange County
Lincoln – Lighthouse Counseling & Family Resource Center
Los Angeles – Baby2Baby
Los Angeles – Good+ Foundation LA
Los Angeles – Los Angeles Regional Food Bank
Martinez – Sweet Beginnings Family Resource Center
Oakland –  SupplyBank.Org
Pleasanton – Childcare Links Diaper Pantry
Riverside – Junior League of Riverside Diaper Bank
Sacramento – Sacramento Food Bank & Family Services
Sacramento –  Starting With A Penny
San Diego – San Diego Food Bank
San Diego – Project Concern International – US & Border Programs
San Francisco – Help A Mother Out
Ukiah – Mendocino Diaper Depot

Colorado

Aurora – WeeCycle
Bloomfield – A Precious Child
Centennial – Rocky Mountain Diaper Depot
Denver – Bottom Line Diaper Bank of Catholic Charities
Loveland – The Nappie Project
Pueblo –  Catholic Charities of Pueblo

Connecticut

Bristol – The Parent and Child Center at Bristol Hospital
Derby – TEAM
Madison – Bare Necessities
North Haven – The Diaper Bank of Connecticut
Putnam – IHSP-Diaper Bank of NECT
Stamford – Salvation Army Dry Bottoms Diaper Bank
Winsted – Second Congregational Church Diaper Bank

Delaware

Middletown – Middletown Diaper Distribution
Rehoboth Beach – Community Resource Center/Harry K Baby Pantry
Wilmington – Catholic Charities Bayard House

District of Columbia

Greater DC Diaper Bank (Silver Spring, Maryland)

Florida

Boca Raton –  Junior League of Boca Raton Diaper Bank
Clearwater – Here We Grow Foundation, Inc. Diaper Bank
Cooper City – Broward Moms Inc. / Greater Fort Lauderdale Diaper Bank
Fort Pierce –  Treasure Coast Food Bank
Jacksonville – Feeding Northeast Florida
Miami – Miami Diaper Bank
Naples – Baby Basics of Collier County, Inc
Panama City – Junior League of Panama City
St. Petersburg – Babycycle
Tampa – Junior League of Tampa 
Winter Park – Baby Basics of St. Margaret Mary Catholic Church 
Winter Garden – Central Florida Diaper Bank

Georgia

Athens – Athens Area Diaper Bank
Columbus – Junior League of Columbus Georgia
Gainesville – Diaper Bank of North Georgia
Norcross – Helping Mamas, Inc

Hawaii

Honolulu – Aloha Diaper Bank
Kamuela – Hawai’i Diaper Bank

Iowa

Cedar Rapids – Eastern Iowa Diaper Bank
Idaho
Meridian – The Idaho Diaper Bank

Illinois

Chicago – Cradles to Crayons Chicago
Chicago – Daughters of Destiny
Evanston – Bundled Blessings Diaper Pantry
Galesburg – Loving Bottoms Diaper Bank
McHenry – Diaper Bank of Northern Illinois
Quincy – West Central Child Care Connection
Tinley Park – SWADDLE (SouthWest Area Diaper Depository for Little Ends)
Waukegan – Diaper Depot – Catholic Charities of the Archdiocese of Chicago
Waukegan – Twice As Nice Mother & Child

Indiana

Bloomington – All-Options Pregnancy Resource Center
Indianapolis – Indiana Diaper Bank
Muncie – The Diaper Bank of East Central Indiana
Terre Haute – Covered With Love, Inc.

Kansas

Kansas City – HappyBottoms
Topeka – Junior League of Topeka’s Diaper Depot

Kentucky

Louisville – Saint Bernadette Diaper Bank

Louisiana

Baton Rouge –  Junior League of Baton Rouge Diaper Bank
New Orleans – Junior League of New Orleans Diaper Bank
Youngsville – Acadiana Diaper Depot, Inc.

Massachusetts

Brighton – Cradles to Crayons- Boston
Framingham – The Diaper Project at A Place To Turn
Hyannis – A Baby Center
Needham – Baby Basics, Inc.
Ware – Jubilee Diaper Ministry
West Stockbridge – Berkshire Community Diaper Project, Austin Riggs Center
Worcester – Marie’s Mission

Maryland

Brooklandville –  ShareBaby, Inc.
Millersville – Walk the Walk Foundation
Princess Anne – Somerset County – Judy Center Partnership
Silver Spring – Greater DC Diaper Bank

Maine

Machias – We Care Community Baby Center 
Portland – Michael Klahr Jewish Family Services

Michigan

Detroit – Metropolitan Detroit Diaper Bank
Detroit – The Natural Momma Me Initiative 
Grand Rapids – Great Start Parent Coalition of Kent County
Holland – Nestlings Diaper Bank
Kalamazoo – St. Luke’s Diaper Bank (c/o St. Luke’s Episcopal Church)
Lansing – Mid-Michigan Diaper Bank 
Midland – The Diaper Alliance
Troy – Baby Basics of Troy
Ypsilanti – Destiny and Purpose Community Outreach (DAPCO)

Minnesota

St. Paul – Diaper Bank of Minnesota
Elko – Shakopee Community Assistance

Mississippi

Clarksdale – Coahoma County Diaper Bank

Missouri

Columbia – Healthy Bottoms Diaper Bank
Fenton – Heroes Care
Higginsville – Higginsville Baby Grace
Kansas City – HappyBottoms
New Madrid – New Madrid County Family Resource Center
Springfield – Diaper Bank of the Ozarks
St. Louis – St. Louis Area Diaper Bank

Montana

Billings – Family Promise of Yellowstone Valley

Nebraska

Omaha – The Life House

Nevada

Las Vegas – Baby’s Bounty
Las Vegas – HELP of Southern Nevada’s Las Vegas Diaper Bank

New Hampshire

Pittsfield – Infant Toddler Diaper Pantry
Rochester – Share Fund Community Diaper Bank

New Jersey

Edgewater – NYC Mamas Give Back 
Hillside – Community FoodBank of NJ
Monroe – Modestly Cover Diaper Bank of Essex County NJ
Mt. Arlington – Child & Family Resources
New Brunswick – Central Jersey Diaper Bank of AECDC, Inc.
Newton – NORWESCAP Diaper Bank 
Oradell – Tony Kyasky Fund | Make A Change Diaper Bank
Paramus – Children’s Aid and Family Services, Inc.
Trenton – The Maker’s Place
Union – Moms Helping Moms Foundation

New Mexico

Santa Fe – The Food Depot

New York

Albany – The Food Pantries
Bronx – The HopeLine (Resource Center for Community Development, Inc.)
Buffalo – Every Bottom Covered
Melville – The Allied Foundation
Newburgh – Baby Steps Baby Pantry at Christ Lutheran Church
New York – Catholic Charities, Archdiocese of New York Diaper Distribution
New York – Good+ Foundation
New York – Little Essentials
Rochester – Junior League of Rochester Diaper Bank
Syracuse – CNY Diaper Bank
Scarsdale – Junior League of Central Westchester

North Carolina 

Boone – Who Needs a Change? of the High Country
Durham – Diaper Bank of NC, Triangle
Wilmington – Diaper Bank of NC, Lower Cape Fear
Winston-Salem – Diaper Bank of NC, Greater Triad

North Dakota

Fargo – Great Plains Food Bank

Ohio

Canton – Stark County Diaper Bank,
Centerville – Hannah’s Treasure Chest,
Cincinnati – Sweet Cheeks Diaper Bank,
Cleves – Baby Basics of Cincinnati,
Columbus – Columbus Diaper Bank,
Columbus – Columbus Diaper Coalition,
Plain City – The Diaper Angels (Jerome United Methodist Church),
Trotwood – Gem City Gives,
Youngstown – Project MKC

Oklahoma

Oklahoma City – Infant Crisis Services, Inc.
Shawnee – Legacy Parenting Center
Tulsa – Emergency Infant Services

Oregon

Lebanon – FISH of Lebanon
Portland – PDX Diaper Bank

Pennsylvania

Allentown – Lehigh Valley Diaper Bank 
Harleysville – Mitzvah Circle Foundation
Harrisburg – Healthy Steps Diaper Bank
Philadelphia – Center for Leadership, Development and Advocacy
Philadelphia – Cradles to Crayons, PA
Philadelphia – The Greater Philadelphia Diaper Bank
Philadelphia – Pamper And Diaper My Baby 
Pittsburgh – Western Pennsylvania Diaper Bank 
Scranton – St. Joseph’s Center
Shippensburg – Booty Bundles Diaper Bank

Rhode Island

Providence – Project Undercover

South Carolina

Charleston – Bundles to Joy Diaper Bank
Charleston – Junior League of Charleston – Charleston Area Diaper Bank
Columbia – Power In Changing
Columbia – South Carolina Diaper Bank

South Dakota

Brookings – Harvest Table
Sioux Falls – Society of St. Vincent de Paul of Sioux Falls

Tennessee

Cordova (Memphis) – Sweet Cheeks Diaper Ministry
Knoxville – Helping Mamas
Lexington – Shiloh Distribution Center 
Memphis – Mid-South Food Bank
Nashville – Nashville Diaper Connection

Texas

Austin – Austin Diaper Bank
Dallas – Hope Supply Co.
Dallas – North Dallas Shared Ministries 
Galveston – Galveston Diaper Bank
Houston – Houston Diaper Bank
McKinney – Baby Booties Diaper Bank
Richmond – Fort Bend Diaper Bank
San Antonio – Texas Diaper Bank
Waco – Waco Diaper Bank

Utah

Logan – Little Lambs Foundation for Kids
Provo – Utah Diaper Bank

Vermont

Burlington – Junior League of Champlain Valley Diaper Bank

Virginia

Ashburn – Nova Diaper Bank
Harrisonburg – Children’s Clothes Closet at Mission Central
Richmond – Capital Diaper Bank
Silver Spring (MD) – Greater DC Diaper Bank
Toms Brook – Shenandoah Lutheran Ministries
Virginia Beach – Greater Hampton Roads Diaper Bank

Washington

Battle Ground – Battle Ground Adventist Community Services
Bellevue – Baby Basics Bellevue
Issaquah – Eastside Baby Corner
La Conner – The Diaper Bank of Skagit County
Olympia – Dry Tikes and Wet Wipes
Pasco – Tri-Cities Diaper Bank 
Seattle – WestSide Baby
Spokane Valley – Inland NW Diaper Bank a program of Spokane Valley Partners

Wisconsin

Beloit – Caritas Diaper Bank 
Eau Claire – The Diaper Bank of Eau Claire (Junior League)
Elkhorn – Walworth County Diaper Bank
Little Chute – Eastern Wisconsin Diaper Bank 
Madison – Pregnancy Helpline, Inc. of Madison 
Menasha – Fox Cities Diaper Bank, an initiative of United Way Fox Cities
Milwaukee – Care Net Pregnancy Center of Milwaukee, Inc.
Sheboygan – BabyCare of The Sheboygan Evangelical Free Church

West Virginia

Charleston – Diaper Drop Charities
Ripley – Ripley Nazarene Mission Baby Pantry 
Weston – Lewis County Diaper Pantry

Wyoming

Rock Springs – Community Diaper Bank of Southwest Wyoming
Sheridan – Volunteers of America Mommy’s Closet

References

Non-profit organizations based in Connecticut